The 2014 World Allround Speed Skating Championships took place at the indoor ice rink of the Thialf arena in Heerenveen, Netherlands, on 22–23 March 2014.

Ireen Wüst won the women's title for the fifth time while Koen Verweij won his first world title.

Rules 
All 24 participating skaters are allowed to skate the first three distances; 8 skaters may take part on the fourth distance. These 8 skaters are determined by taking the standings on the longest of the first three distances, as well as the samalog standings after three distances, and comparing these lists as follows:

 Skaters among the top 8 on both lists are qualified.
 To make up a total of 8, skaters are then added in order of their best rank on either list. Samalog standings take precedence over the longest-distance standings in the event of a tie.

Men's championships

Allround results

Women's championships

Allround results

References

See also 
 Speed skating at the 2014 Winter Olympics

World Allround Speed Skating Championships
2014 World Allround
World Allround, 2014
World Allround Speed Skating Championships
World Allround Speed Skating Championships, 2014